Khakurinokhabl (Hekurynehabl) is a rural locality (an aul) and the administrative center of Shovgenovsky District of the Republic of Adygea, Russia, located on the Fars River,  north of Maykop. Population:

History
Until March 27, 1996, the aul was called Shovgenovsky.

Culture and education
There is a museum of Khusen Andrukhayev, a Hero of Soviet Union, founded in 1973 in the aul. As of 2003, there are no educational facilities above the level of secondary school.

Ecology
The landfill of Khakurinokhabl is located dangerously close (2 km) to the Fars River and to the agricultural lands, posing high ecological risk since the time of its opening in 2000.

References

External links
History of Khakurinokhabl 
Official website of Kh. B. Andrukhayev Memorial Museum of Khakurinokhabl 

Rural localities in Shovgenovsky District